Poperechny is a rural locality (a khutor) and the administrative center of Poperechenskoye Rural Settlement, Kotelnikovsky District, Volgograd Oblast, Russia. The population was 600 as of 2010. There are 14 streets.

Geography 
Poperechny is located 40 km southeast of Kotelnikovo (the district's administrative centre) by road. Rassvet is the nearest rural locality.

References 

Rural localities in Kotelnikovsky District